Mardy S. Ireland  is an author and psychoanalyst, who practices in Raleigh, North Carolina.  Previously she practiced and taught in Berkeley, California.

Biography
Ireland is a founding member of the Lacanian School of Psychoanalysis, and was a member of the faculty at the Psychoanalytic Institute of Northern California.

In 1993, Ireland wrote "Reconceiving Women: Separating Motherhood From Female Identity", which focuses on three types of women: mothers, child-less, and child-free. Acknowledging the distinction child-free became critical as a legitimate choice for women. The work was the subsequent subject of a doctoral thesis.  The New York Times reviewed this book.  The "academic book" had struck a chord and found broad appeal.

In North Carolina, she became involved with and was interviewed about the Peaceful Schools Project regarding school bullying.

Publications

References

1960 births
Living people
American psychoanalysts